The 2015 Rose Bowl (officially known as the College Football Playoff Semifinal at the Rose Bowl Game presented by Northwestern Mutual) was a college football bowl game played on January 1, 2015, at the Rose Bowl stadium in Pasadena, California. This 101st Rose Bowl Game, as a semifinal for the College Football Playoff (CFP), matched the Oregon Ducks against the Florida State Seminoles as selected by the system's selection committee to compete for a spot at the National Championship game to be played on January 12, 2015, at AT&T Stadium in Arlington, Texas. It was one of the 2014–15 bowl games that concluded the 2014 FBS football season.

The game was televised on ESPN and ESPN Deportes, and broadcast on ESPN Radio and XM Satellite Radio, with the kickoff time set for 5 p.m. ET (2 p.m. local time).  The Pasadena Tournament of Roses Association organized the game. The Northwestern Mutual financial services organization sponsored the game.

On the match day, the 126th edition of the annual Rose Parade took place at 8 am Pacific Time with a theme of Inspiring Stories.

Oregon won the game, beating Florida State, the last undefeated team of the season, by the score of 59–20 and advanced to the inaugural College Football Playoff National Championship Game, assuring that no team would finish the season with a perfect record.

Pre-game activities
After the teams' arrival in Southern California, the teams participated in the traditional Lawry's Beef Bowl in Beverly Hills and the Disney Media Day at Disney California Adventure in nearby Anaheim. The teams were also treated to The LA Improv in Hollywood. The Rose Bowl Hall of Fame ceremony luncheon was held prior to the game at the Pasadena Convention Center. Knute Rockne, Notre Dame; Dick Vermeil, UCLA; and Ki-Jana Carter, Penn State headlined the Rose Bowl Hall of Fame Class of 2014.

Pre-game activities were held at the Rose Bowl parking lots and at Brookside Golf Course.

Teams
The two participants were announced on December 7, 2014 (12:45 PM ET), based on the final rankings by the CFP committee. The Oregon Ducks will play the Florida State Seminoles. The matchups for the Rose Bowl and the other semifinal, the Sugar Bowl in New Orleans, were geographically selected to ensure the top team will be closest to its fanbase. More than one team from the same conference may participate in the game, and avoiding rematches will not be a selection factor.

Traditionally, the Rose Bowl pits the winners of the Big Ten Conference and Pac-12 Conference; however, when the Rose Bowl is a CFP semifinal (every three years beginning with this game), any teams may be selected. Oregon was the Pac-12 champion, but the Big Ten champion Ohio State played in (and won) the Sugar Bowl. The 2015 edition of the Rose Bowl was the first time since the 2006 edition (BCS National Championship Game) that the Big Ten Conference was absent from the game. It was also the first ever time in the 101-year history of the Rose Bowl that the Atlantic Coast Conference made an appearance in the game. Duke did appear in 1942, however, the ACC never was established until 1953. Also, while Miami competed and won the 2002 game, which was also a BCS National Championship Game. However, Miami was still a member of the original Big East Conference.

Florida State

Florida State wore its white jerseys and used the east bench on game day.

Oregon

Oregon wore its green jerseys and used the west bench on game day.

Game summary

Scoring summary

Source:

Statistics

Records

Oregon broke the record for the most points (59) scored in a Rose Bowl, surpassing the previous record of 49 (set in 1902, then tied in 1948 and 2008). Oregon's 41 points in the second half were also the most ever scored in one half of a Rose Bowl. Oregon set the Rose Bowl record for total offensive yards (639).

Game notes
 On May 14, 2014, Northwestern Mutual signed an agreement to be the presenting sponsor of the game from 2015 through 2020.
 Tickets cost $225 per seat, while end zone seats cost $150. The total ticket allotment for both teams is approximately 25,000. 
 The game featured both the 2013 and 2014 Heisman Trophy winners; for 2013: FSU quarterback Jameis Winston and for 2014: Oregon quarterback Marcus Mariota. This was only the third such meeting.  Both quarterbacks would later be selected with the first and second overall picks in the 2015 NFL draft by the Buccaneers and Titans, respectively, and met in Week 1 of the 2015 NFL regular season with Mariota's Titans winning 42–14.
 Oregon's victory ended FSU's school-record winning streak at 29 games dating back to late in the 2012 season.
 This was the first meeting between these two teams.

Related events
 June 28, 2014 – Northwestern Mutual Youth Clinic
 December 7, 2014 – Selection Sunday
 December 27, 28, 29, 2014 – Float Decorating & Viewing Event for Rose Parade 2015
 December 28, 29, 2014 – Lawry's Beef Bowl
 December 29, 2014 – Equestfest powered by Wells Fargo
 December 29, 30, 2014 – Bandfest powered by REMO
 December 30, 2014 – The Rose Bowl Hall of Fame Induction Ceremony, noon at the Pasadena Convention Center
 December 31, 2014 – Kickoff Luncheon in Rose Bowl Area
 January 1, 2015 – Rose Bowl Game Public Tailgate Parties
 January 1, 2015 – Rose Bowl 2015 VIP Hospitality Event

References

Rose Bowl
Rose
Rose Bowl Game
Rose Bowl
Florida State Seminoles football bowl games
Oregon Ducks football bowl games
January 2015 sports events in the United States
21st century in Pasadena, California